Jack Edwin Hamilton (December 25, 1938 – February 22, 2018) was an American professional baseball pitcher, who played in Major League Baseball (MLB), from –, for the Philadelphia Phillies, Detroit Tigers, New York Mets, California Angels, Cleveland Indians, and Chicago White Sox.

Professional career

Originally signed by the St. Louis Cardinals as a free agent, Hamilton debuted in MLB as a starting pitcher for the Phillies in 1962 and posted a 9–12 record with an earned run average of 5.09. Pitching for the Mets on May 4, 1966, Hamilton tossed a one-hitter against the Cardinals in St. Louis; the one hit being a bunt single by opposing pitcher Ray Sadecki. He showed more promise pitching out of the bullpen, and spent most of his career as a relief pitcher until his retirement in 1969, although he was converted back to a starting pitcher for the 1966 and 1967 seasons. In 1967, Hamilton was traded by the Mets to the Angels.

Tony Conigliaro beaning incident
On August 18, the Angels were playing the Boston Red Sox in a game that would have important implications for the American League (AL) pennant race. While facing outfielder Tony Conigliaro, Hamilton hit him with a pitch on his left cheekbone that fractured both his cheekbone and eye socket, and severely damaged his retina. Conigliaro nearly died, and the damage to his vision kept him off the field the remainder of the year and all of 1968. Conigliaro made a promising-but-brief comeback in 1969–1970, until his vision problems returned, which eventually forced his early retirement from baseball in 1975 at age 30.  

Hamilton retired in 1969, finishing his career with the White Sox.

Personal life

Hamilton lived in Branson, Missouri with his wife, Jan. Together, they had a son and two daughters. After his retirement from baseball, Hamilton owned and operated several restaurants in Iowa and Southwest Missouri. He died on February 22, 2018, at age 79.

References

 1958 Baseball Guide, published by The Sporting News, p. 349.
 1968 Baseball Register published by The Sporting News.
 Passan, Jeff, "Accidental villain" (August 17, 2007), Yahoo! Sports. Retrieved on August 17, 2007.

External links

Jack Hamilton at Ultimate Mets Database

1938 births
2018 deaths
Arkansas Travelers players
Baseball players from Iowa
California Angels players
Chicago White Sox players
Cleveland Indians players
Decatur Commodores players
Detroit Tigers players
Keokuk Cardinals players
Major League Baseball pitchers
Memphis Chickasaws players
New York Mets players
People from Burlington, Iowa
People from Branson, Missouri
Philadelphia Phillies players
Seattle Angels players
Syracuse Chiefs players
Tucson Toros players
Williamsport Grays players
Winston-Salem Red Birds players
Wytheville Cardinals players
York White Roses players